Hans Van Themsche (born 7 February, 1988, in Wilrijk, Antwerp, Flemish Region of Belgium) is a Belgian student who, on 11 March, 2006, shot three people, killing two and severely injuring another, before being shot by police and incapacitated. He was sentenced to life in prison in 2008.

The homicide received widespread media attention and drew major public and political attention to responsibilities regarding political presentation of immigrant and racial issues and its possible effects on individuals.

On 19 May on Canvas TV, foreign minister Karel De Gucht held "not only the extreme right Vlaams Belang party" but "also the voters of this party" responsible "for the climate of racism" in which the murders took place.

Aftermath

Mayor Patrick Janssens and several hundred locals followed the family of Oulemata Niangadou and representatives of African and Turkish organisations in a silent march towards the spots of the shootings on the morning thereafter. Amongst speeches held, the president of the city's Council for the Policy regarding Ethnical and Cultural Minorities, Georges Kamanayo, accused "the leaders of extreme right parties" of moral complicity.

An impromptu peaceful protest against Vlaams Belang organized on 15 May at Brussels held the traditional minute of silence for Van Themsche's victims.

During the night of 16–17 May 2006, a Molotov cocktail was thrown into the head office of the Flemish nationalist youth organisation Vlaams Nationaal Jeugdverbond (VNJ) in Berchem that has links to the Vlaams Belang. A Turkish courier was able to quickly extinguish the fire, crucially, as the apartment above the office was inhabited (as it turned out, by the mother of New Flemish Alliance (N-VA) president Bart De Wever).

In the wake of the murders, the government tried to take action against Flemish entries on websites where it judged hate and racism to be spread, such as Stormfront. This proved difficult, because the sites are American and protected by the First Amendment.

The case expedited a law that halted the possibility of buying lethal firearms of all kind on impulse and making the licensing almost strictest in the world.

In July 2007, a municipal decree came in effect that forbids the display of weapons in Antwerp shop windows. The Governor of the Province rejected the appeal filed by arms dealer Lang, who had sold Van Themsche the murder weapon.

On 10 May 2008, the Standaard Uitgeverij published justice reporter Gust Verwerft's book De Zaak Hans Van Themsche (The Case of Hans Van Themsche).

References

External links
 'Terror in the park', Al Ahram Weekly, 18 May 2006, article by Khaled Diab on the political exchange of fire that took place in the wake of the shootings.
 Media technologies and democracy in an enlarged Europe (The intellectual work of the  2007 European media and communication doctoral Summer school) (Programme supported by the Socrates Erasmus IP project, the European Communication Research and Education Association, the University of Tartu and a consortium of 19 universities) chapter: '4. Case-study: Blogs, online forums, public spaces and the extreme right in North Belgium' (including '4.2.2. The murder of Oulematou Niangadou and Luna Drowart'), Bart Cammaerts, Tartu University Press 2007,  (print)  (print)  (PDF)  (PDF)

21st-century Belgian criminals
1988 births
Belgian people convicted of murder
Belgian prisoners sentenced to life imprisonment
Belgian spree killers
Belgian murderers of children
Living people
People convicted of murder by Belgium
Criminals from Antwerp
People from Wilrijk
People with Asperger syndrome
People with narcissistic personality disorder
Prisoners sentenced to life imprisonment by Belgium
Racially motivated violence against black people
Spree shootings in Belgium